The India men's national under-19 volleyball team represents India in men's under-19 volleyball Events, it is controlled and managed by the Volleyball Federation of India (VFI) that is a member of Asian volleyball body Asian Volleyball Confederation (AVC) and the international volleyball body government the Fédération Internationale de Volleyball (FIVB).

Tournament record

References

National men's under-19 volleyball teams
Volleyball in India
Volleyball